Jamaica is a neighborhood in the New York City borough of Queens. It is mainly composed of a large commercial and retail area, though part of the neighborhood is also residential. Jamaica is bordered by Hollis to the east; St. Albans, Springfield Gardens, Rochdale Village to the southeast; South Jamaica to the south; Richmond Hill and South Ozone Park to the west; Briarwood to the northwest; and Kew Gardens Hills, Jamaica Hills, and Jamaica Estates to the north.

Jamaica, originally a designation for an area greater than the current neighborhood, was settled under Dutch rule in 1656. It was originally called  before it took its current name. Subsequently, under English rule Jamaica became the center of the "Town of Jamaica". It was the first county seat of Queens County, holding that title from 1683 to 1788, and was also the first incorporated village on Long Island. When Queens was incorporated into the City of Greater New York in 1898, both the Town of Jamaica and the Village of Jamaica were dissolved, but the neighborhood of Jamaica regained its role as county seat. Today, some locals group Jamaica's surrounding neighborhoods into an unofficial Greater Jamaica area encompassing most or all of the extent of the former town.

Jamaica is the location of several government buildings such as Queens Civil Court, the civil branch of the Queens County Supreme Court, the Queens County Family Court and the Joseph P. Addabbo Federal Building, home to the Social Security Administration's Northeastern Program Service Center. The U.S. Food and Drug Administration's Northeast Regional Laboratory as well as the New York District Office are also located in Jamaica. Jamaica Center, the area around Jamaica Avenue, is a major commercial center. The New York Racing Association, based at Aqueduct Racetrack in South Ozone Park, lists its official address as Jamaica (Central Jamaica once housed NYRA's Jamaica Racetrack, now the massive Rochdale Village housing development). John F. Kennedy International Airport and the hotels nearby are also located in Jamaica. The neighborhood is located in Queens Community District 12. It is patrolled by the New York City Police Department's 103rd and 113th Precincts.

History

Etymology 

The neighborhood was named Yameco, a corruption of the word  yamecah, meaning "beaver", in the language spoken by the Lenape, the Native Americans who lived in the area at the time of first European contact. The liquid "y" sound of English is spelled with a "j" in Dutch, the language of the first people to write about the area; the English retained this Dutch spelling, but, after repeated reading and speaking of "Jamaica", slowly replaced the liquid sound with the hard "j" of the English pronunciation of the name today.  (In the Caribbean, the aboriginal Arawaks named their island Xaymaca, "land of wood and water", and the "x" spelling in Spanish was in time transformed to the hard "j" of the modern English name, "Jamaica".)

Precolonial and colonial periods 
Jamaica Avenue was an ancient trail for tribes from as far away as the Ohio River and the Great Lakes, coming to trade skins and furs for wampum. It was in 1655 that the first settlers paid the Native Americans with two guns, a coat, and some powder and lead, for the land lying between the old trail and "Beaver Pond" (now filled in; what is now Tuckerton Street north of Liberty Avenue runs through the site of the old pond, and Beaver Road was named for its western edge). Dutch Director-General Peter Stuyvesant dubbed the area  ("rest-town") in granting the 1656 land patent.

The English took over in 1664 and made it part of the county of Yorkshire. In 1683, when the Crown divided the colony of New York into counties, Jamaica became the county seat of Queens County, one of the original counties of New York.

Colonial Jamaica had a band of 56 minutemen who played an active part in the Battle of Long Island, the outcome of which led to the occupation of the New York City area by British troops during most of the American Revolutionary War. Rufus King, a signer of the United States Constitution, relocated here in 1805.  He added to a modest 18th-century farmhouse, creating the manor which stands on the site today. King Manor was restored at the turn of the 21st century to its former glory, and houses King Manor Museum.

Late 18th and 19th centuries 
By 1776, Jamaica had become a trading post for farmers and their produce.  For more than a century, their horse-drawn carts plodded along Jamaica Avenue, then called King's Highway. The Jamaica Post Office opened September 25, 1794, and was the only post office in the present-day Boroughs of Queens or Brooklyn before 1803. Union Hall Academy for boys, and Union Hall Seminary for girls, were chartered in 1787. The Academy eventually attracted students from all over the United States and the West Indies. The public school system was started in 1813 with funds of $125. Jamaica Village, the first village on Long Island, was incorporated in 1814 with its boundaries being from the present-day Van Wyck Expressway (on the west) and Jamaica Avenue (on the north, later Hillside Avenue) to Farmers Boulevard (on the east) and Linden Boulevard (on the south) in what is now St. Albans. By 1834, the Brooklyn and Jamaica Railroad company had completed a line to Jamaica.

In 1850, the former Kings Highway (now Jamaica Avenue) became the Brooklyn and Jamaica Plank Road, complete with toll gate. In 1866, tracks were laid for a horsecar line, and 20 years later it was electrified, the first in the state. On January 1, 1898, Queens became part of the City of New York, and Jamaica became the county seat.

20th and 21st centuries 

The present Jamaica station of the Long Island Rail Road was completed in 1913, and the BMT Jamaica Line arrived in 1918, followed by the IND Queens Boulevard Line in 1936 and the IND/BMT Archer Avenue Lines in 1988, the latter of which replaced the eastern portion of the Jamaica Line that was torn down in 1977–85. The 1920s and 1930s saw the building of the Valencia Theatre (now restored by the Tabernacle of Prayer), the "futuristic" Kurtz furniture store and the Roxanne Building. In the 1970s, it became the headquarters for the Islamic Society of North America. King Kullen opened in 1930, and was the first self-service supermarket in the country.

The many foreclosures and the high level of unemployment of the 2000s and early 2010s induced many black people to move from Jamaica to the South, as part of the New Great Migration.

A December 2012 junkyard fire required the help of 170 firemen to extinguish.

On October 23, 2014, the neighborhood was the site of a terrorist hatchet attack on two police officers of the New York City Police Department. The police later killed the attacker.

The First Reformed Church, Grace Episcopal Church Complex, Jamaica Chamber of Commerce Building, Jamaica Savings Bank, King Manor, J. Kurtz and Sons Store Building, La Casina, Office of the Register, Prospect Cemetery, St. Monica's Church, Sidewalk Clock at 161-11 Jamaica Avenue, New York, NY, Trans World Airlines Flight Center, and United States Post Office are listed on the National Register of Historic Places.

Demographics 

Based on data from the 2010 United States Census, the population of Jamaica was 53,751 an increase of 1,902 (3.5%) from the 51,849 counted in 2000.

The racial makeup of the neighborhood was 3.6% (1,949) Non-Hispanic White, 22.2% (11,946) Black or African American, 0.9% (466) Native American, 24.3% (13,073) Asian, 0.1% (66) Pacific Islander, 5.2% (2,814) from other races, and 4.9% (2,647) from two or more races. Hispanic or Latino residents of any race were 38.7% (20,790) of the population.

The entirety of Community Board 12, which mainly comprises Jamaica but also includes Hollis, had 232,911 inhabitants as of NYC Health's 2018 Community Health Profile, with an average life expectancy of 80.5 years. This is slightly lower than the median life expectancy of 81.2 for all New York City neighborhoods. Most inhabitants are youth and middle-aged adults: 22% are between the ages of between 0–17, 27% between 25 and 44, and 27% between 45 and 64. The ratio of college-aged and elderly residents was lower, at 10% and 14% respectively.

As of 2017, the median household income in Community Board 12 was $61,670. In 2018, an estimated 20% of Jamaica and Hollis residents lived in poverty, compared to 19% in all of Queens and 20% in all of New York City. One in eight residents (12%) were unemployed, compared to 8% in Queens and 9% in New York City. Rent burden, or the percentage of residents who have difficulty paying their rent, is 56% in Jamaica and Hollis, higher than the boroughwide and citywide rates of 53% and 51% respectively. Based on this calculation, Jamaica and Hollis are considered to be high-income relative to the rest of the city and not gentrifying.

Demographic distribution

The borough of Queens, where Jamaica is located, is one of the most ethnically diverse counties in the world. Jamaica is large and has a diverse population, predominantly African Americans, Caribbean/West Indians, Hispanics, and Asians/Asian Indians.

Jamaica was not always as diverse as it is today. Throughout the 19th to early 20th centuries, Jamaica was mainly populated with whites as new Irish immigrants settled around the places known today as Downtown and Baisley Pond Park. In the 1950s, however, a long period of white flight began that lasted through the 1970s and 1980s with mainly middle-income African Americans taking their place. Beginning in 1965 and through the 1970s, more West Indians immigrated to the United States than ever before, most of whom settled in New York City. In addition, many Salvadoran, Colombian, and Dominican immigrants moved in. These ethnic groups tended to stay more towards the Jamaica Avenue and South Jamaica areas. Decrease in crime attracted many families to Jamaica's safe havens; Hillside Avenue reflects this trend. Along 150th to 161st streets, much of the stores and restaurants typify South American and Caribbean cultures.

Farther east is the rapidly growing East Indian community. Mainly spurred on by the Jamaica Muslim Center, Bangladeshis have flocked to this area due to easy transit access and the numerous Bangladeshi stores and restaurants lining 167th and 168th Streets. Bangladeshis are the most rapidly growing ethnic group here; however, it is also an African-American commercial area. Many Sri Lankans also live in this area for similar reasons as the Bangladeshi community, reflected by the numerous food and grocery establishments along Hillside Avenue catering to the community. As well as the large South Asian community, significant Filipino and African communities thrive in Jamaica, along with the neighboring Filipino community in Queens Village and the historic, well established African-American community residing in Jamaica.

From 151st Street and into 164th Street, many groceries and restaurants are representative of the West Indies.  Mainly of Guyanese and Trinidadian origin, these merchants serve their respective populations in and around the Jamaica Center area. Many East Indian shops are located east from 167th Street to 171st Street. Mainly supported by the ever-growing Bangladeshi population, thousands of South Asians come here to shop for Bangladeshi goods. 
Also there are restaurants such as "Sagar", "Ambala", "Ghoroa", and countless more in the Bangladeshi stronghold here.
Some people call this area another "Little South Asia" similar to that of Jackson Heights. Jamaica is another South Asian ethnic enclave in New York City, as South Asian immigration and the city's South Asian population has grown rapidly.

Economy

History 

Economic development was long neglected. In the 1960s and 1970s, many big box retailers moved to suburban areas where business was more profitable. Departing retailers included brand name stores and movie theaters that once thrived in Jamaica's busiest areas. Macy's and the Valencia theater were the last companies to move out in 1969. The 1980s crack epidemic created even more hardship and crime. Prime real estate spaces were filled by hair salons and 99 cent stores. Furthermore, existing zoning patterns and inadequate infrastructure did not anticipate future development.

Since then, the decrease of the crime rate has encouraged entrepreneurs who plan to invest in the area. The Greater Jamaica Development Corporation (GJDC), the local business improvement district, acquired valuable real estate for sale to national chains in order to expand neighborhood commerce. As well they have completed underway proposals by allocating funds and providing loans to potential investors who have already established something in the area. One Jamaica Center is a mixed-use commercial complex that was built in 2002 by The Mattone Group housing Old Navy, Bally Total Fitness, Walgreens, Subway, Dunkin' Donuts, a 15-screen multiplex theater and for a while a Gap. Banking has also made a strong revival as Bank of America, Sterling National Bank, Chase Bank, and Carver Federal Savings Bank have each created at least one branch along various major streets: Jamaica Avenue, Parsons Boulevard, Merrick Boulevard, and Sutphin Boulevard. In 2006, a $75 million deal between the developers, the Mattone Group and Ceruzzi Enterprises, and Home Depot cleared the way for a new location at 168th Street and Archer Avenue.

The most prominent piece of development has been the renovation and expansion of the Jamaica station from 2001 to 2006. The station, which served the Long Island Rail Road (LIRR), was expanded with a new transfer to the AirTrain JFK to John F. Kennedy International Airport. A further capacity increase includes a new platform for the LIRR at Jamaica station, set to open in 2019.

Efforts have been made to follow the examples of major redevelopment occurring in Astoria, Long Island City, Flushing, and Downtown Brooklyn. In 2005, the New York City Department of City Planning drafted a plan that would rezone 368 blocks of Jamaica in order to stimulate new development, relieve traffic congestion, and shift upscale amenities away from low-density residential neighborhoods. The plan includes up-zoning the immediate areas around Jamaica Station to accommodate passengers traveling through the area. To improve infrastructure the New York City Department of Parks & Recreation has agreed to create more greenery and open spaces to allow pedestrians to enjoy the scenery. At the same time, the city has reserved the right to protect the suburban/residential charm of neighboring areas. Several blocks will be down-zoned to keep up with the existing neighborhood character. Jamaica is home to large African American, Caribbean, and Central American populations. On September 10, 2007, the City Council overwhelmingly approved the plan, providing for structures of up to 28 stories to be built around the main transit hub as well as residential buildings of up to 7 stories to be built on Hillside Avenue.

Several projects are in progress. The New York City Economic Development Corporation has issued an RFP for redevelopment of a  abandoned garage located at 168th Street and 93rd Avenue. Plans are underway to convert this space into retail and parking spots. "TechnoMart Queens" was the first approved project. Located at Sutphin Blvd. and 94th Ave., Korean-based Prime Construction Corp., Greater Jamaica Development Corporation, and several other partners have signed a deal to create a 13-story mega-mall. 9 floors will be dedicated towards wholesale electronics, 3 floors to retail space for shopping, and it is estimated to contain parking for up to 800 cars. Groundbreaking on this site will initiate in late 2008 and is slated for completion by mid-2011. However, in Q3 2008, Technomart announced that it would not be moving forward with its plan to bring a retailer to the community.

According to real-estate listing service StreetEasy, Jamaica's real-estate prices are rising the fastest out of all localities in New York City. The community's median home prices rose 39% in 2015. The median sales price for a small row house in 2015 was $330,000, and the median asking rent for a three-bedroom house in 2015 was $1,750. Sutphin Boulevard has been described as "the next tourist hot spot."  Jamaica's proximity to the JFK AirTrain has stimulated the development of several hotels. The 165th Street Mall Improvement Association is a NYC BID Association that focuses on these specific developed stores in Jamaica, Queens.

Notable businesses

Aviation 

The Federal Aviation Administration Eastern Region has its offices at Rockaway Boulevard in South Jamaica, near JFK Airport.

Several businesses are at the nearby John F. Kennedy International Airport. North American Airlines has its headquarters on the property of JFK. In addition, Nippon Cargo Airlines maintains its New York City offices there.

When Tower Air existed, its headquarters were at the airport. When Metro International Airways existed, its headquarters were at the airport.

Social Security

The Northeastern Program Service Center (NEPSC) is located in the Joseph P. Addabbo Federal Building at Parsons Boulevard and Jamaica Avenue. The NEPSC serves approximately 8.6 million retirement, survivor, and disability insurance (RSDI) beneficiaries, whose Social Security numbers begin with 001 through 134, 729, and 805 through 808. The NEPSC also processes disability claims for beneficiaries age 54 and over for the same SSN series. Constructed in 1989, the  federal building is a 12-story masonry and steel office structure that was built for the agency and was given $8.5 million 2017 dollars to consolidate operations of SS to the lower 2 floors and bring other Federal leaseholders from other parts of Queens to occupy the upper floors. The funds approved were part of budget cuts proposed during the Obama administration.

Other businesses 

Grupo TACA operates a Jamaica-area TACA Satellite at 149–16 Jamaica Avenue.

Police and crime
Jamaica is patrolled by two precincts of the NYPD. The 103rd Precinct is located at 168-02 91st Avenue and serves downtown Jamaica and Hollis, while the 113th Precinct is located at 167-02 Baisley Boulevard and serves St. Albans and South Jamaica.

The 103rd Precinct ranked 51st safest out of 69 patrol areas for per-capita crime in 2010, while the 113th Precinct ranked 55th safest. , with a non-fatal assault rate of 68 per 100,000 people, Jamaica and Hollis's rate of violent crimes per capita is more than that of the city as a whole. The incarceration rate of 789 per 100,000 people is higher than that of the city as a whole.

The 103rd Precinct has a lower crime rate than in the 1990s, with crimes across all categories having decreased by 80.6% between 1990 and 2018. The precinct reported 5 murders, 31 rapes, 346 robberies, 408 felony assaults, 152 burglaries, 466 grand larcenies, and 79 grand larcenies auto in 2018.
The 113th Precinct also has a lower crime rate than in the 1990s, with crimes across all categories having decreased by 86.1% between 1990 and 2018. The precinct reported 5 murders, 28 rapes, 156 robberies, 383 felony assaults, 153 burglaries, 414 grand larcenies, and 138 grand larcenies auto in 2018.

Fire safety

Jamaica contains four New York City Fire Department (FDNY) fire stations:
 Engine Company 275/Ladder Company 133 – 111-36 Merrick Boulevard
 Engine Company 298/Ladder Company 127/Battalion 50 – 153-11 Hillside Avenue
 Engine Company 302/Ladder Company 155 – 143-15 Rockaway Boulevard
 Engine Company 303/Ladder Company 126 – 104-12 Princeton Street

Health
, preterm births and births to teenage mothers are more common in Jamaica and Hollis than in other places citywide. In Jamaica and Hollis, there were 100 preterm births per 1,000 live births (compared to 87 per 1,000 citywide), and 21.4 births to teenage mothers per 1,000 live births (compared to 19.3 per 1,000 citywide). Jamaica and Hollis have a low population of residents who are uninsured. In 2018, this population of uninsured residents was estimated to be 5%, lower than the citywide rate of 12%.

Eight percent of Jamaica and Hollis residents are smokers, which is lower than the city average of 14% of residents being smokers. In Jamaica and Hollis, 30% of residents are obese, 16% are diabetic, and 37% have high blood pressure—compared to the citywide averages of 22%, 8%, and 23% respectively. In addition, 23% of children are obese, compared to the citywide average of 20%.

Eighty-six percent of residents eat some fruits and vegetables every day, which is slightly less than the city's average of 87%. In 2018, 82% of residents described their health as "good," "very good," or "excellent," higher than the city's average of 78%. For every supermarket in Jamaica and Hollis, there are 20 bodegas.

The nearest major hospitals are Jamaica Hospital and Queens Hospital Center, both located in Jamaica.

Post offices and ZIP Codes

Jamaica is covered by multiple ZIP Codes. West of Sutphin Boulevard, Jamaica falls under ZIP Codes 11435 north of Linden Boulevard and 11436 south of Linden Boulevard. East of Sutphin Boulevard, Jamaica is part of three ZIP Codes: 11432 north of Jamaica Avenue, 11433 between Jamaica Avenue and Linden Boulevard, and 11434 south of Linden Boulevard. The United States Post Office operates four post offices nearby:
 Briarwood Station – 138-69 Queens Boulevard
 Jamaica Station – 88-40 164th Street
 Archer Avenue New Station – 97-03 Sutphin Boulevard
 Rochdale Village Station – 165-100 Baisley Boulevard

Education 
Jamaica and Hollis gen a lower rate of college-educated residents than the rest of the city . While 29% of residents age 25 and older have a college education or higher, 19% have less than a high school education and 51% are high school graduates or have some college education. By contrast, 39% of Queens residents and 43% of city residents have a college education or higher. The percentage of Jamaica and Hollis students excelling in math rose from 36% in 2000 to 55% in 2011, and reading achievement increased slightly from 44% to 45% during the same time period.

Jamaica and Hollis's rate of elementary school student absenteeism is more than the rest of New York City. In Jamaica and Hollis, 22% of elementary school students missed twenty or more days per school year, higher than the citywide average of 20%. Additionally, 74% of high school students in Jamaica and Hollis graduate on time, about the same as the citywide average of 75%.

Primary and secondary schools

Public schools 

Jamaica's public schools are operated by the New York City Department of Education.

Public high schools in Jamaica include:

 Springfield Gardens Educational Campus (formerly Springfield Gardens High School)
 August Martin High School
 Eagle Academy for Young Men of Southeast Queens
 Thomas A. Edison Vocational and Technical High School
 Hillcrest High School
 Campus Magnet Educational Campus (formerly Andrew Jackson High School)
 Jamaica Campus (formerly Jamaica High School), an official municipal landmark
 Queens High School for the Sciences at York College
 Queens Gateway to Health Sciences Secondary School
 High School for Law Enforcement and Public Safety
 The Young Women's Leadership School of Queens
 York Early College Academy

Public elementary and middle schools in Jamaica include:

 PS 40 Samuel Huntington
 PS 45 Clarence Witherspoon
 PS 48 William Wordsworth
 PS 50 Talfourd Lawn
 PS 80
 PS 86
 PS 95
 PS 131 Abigail Adams
 PS 160
 PS 182 Samantha Smith
 IS 238 Susan B Anthony
 IS 8
 JHS 72 Catherine and Count Basie
 JHS 217 Robert A. Van Wyck

Private schools 

Private schools in Jamaica include:

 Al-Iman School, an Islamic PK-12 school.
 Archbishop Molloy High School, formerly an all-boys' Catholic high school, now co-ed.
 Immaculate Conception School, a co-ed Catholic school from pre-K to 8th grade. The school is a local landmark located on the property of Immaculate Conception Church and Monastery, run by the Passionist Congregation of priests.
 St. Nicholas of Tolentine, a co-ed Catholic school from pre-K to 8th grade, run by the Sisters of Charity
 The Mary Louis Academy, a Catholic girls' high school run by the Sisters of St. Joseph.
 United Nations International School, a private school in Jamaica Estates.
 Cariculum Academy Preschool of Southeast Queens, a community schoolhouse
 Our Lady's Catholic Academy, located in South Ozone Park. it is a co-ed school from nursery to grade 8

The Catholic schools are administered by the Roman Catholic Diocese of Brooklyn.

From its 1975 founding to around 1980, the Japanese School of New York was located in Jamaica Estates, near Jamaica.

Colleges and universities 

Several colleges and universities make their home in Jamaica proper or in its close vicinity, most notably:

 York College, a senior college of the City University of New York
 St. John's University (Queens Campus), a private Catholic University founded by the Vincentian Fathers (Lazarists)
 Queens College, a nearby senior college of the City University of New York
 New Brunswick Theological Seminary offers classes at a satellite campus on the St. John's University campus.

Libraries
The Queens Public Library operates four branches in Jamaica:
 The Baisley Park branch at 117-11 Sutphin Boulevard
 The Central Library at 89-11 Merrick Boulevard
 The Rochdale Village branch at 169-09 137th Avenue
 The South Jamaica branch at 108-41 Guy R. Brewer Boulevard 

An additional two branches are located nearby:
 The St. Albans branch at 191-05 Linden Boulevard
 The Briarwood branch at 85-12 Main Street

Transportation

Public transport 

Jamaica station is a central transfer point on the Long Island Rail Road (LIRR), which is headquartered in a building adjoining the station. All of the commuter railroad's passenger branches except for the Port Washington Branch run through the station.

The New York City Subway's IND Queens Boulevard Line terminate at 179th Street station, at the foot of Jamaica Estates, a neighborhood of mansions north of Jamaica's central business district. The Archer Avenue Lines serve Sutphin Boulevard–Archer Avenue–JFK Airport and Jamaica Center–Parsons/Archer stations. The Jamaica Yard, at the south end of Flushing Meadows–Corona Park, abuts Grand Central Parkway and the Van Wyck Expressway.

Jamaica's bus network provides extensive service across eastern Queens, as well as to points in Nassau County, the Bronx, the Rockaways, and Midtown Manhattan. Nearly all bus lines serving Jamaica terminate near either the 165th Street Bus Terminal or the Jamaica Center subway station, except for the Q46 bus, which operates along Union Turnpike, at the northern border of Jamaica.

Greater Jamaica is also home to John F. Kennedy International Airport, one of the busiest international airports in the United States and the world. Public transportation passengers are connected to airline terminals by AirTrain JFK, which operates as both an airport terminal circulator and rail connection to central Jamaica at the integrated LIRR and bi-level subway station located at Sutphin Blvd and Archer Avenue.

Major thoroughfares 
Major streets include Archer Avenue, Hillside Avenue, Jamaica Avenue, Liberty Avenue, Merrick Boulevard, Rockaway Boulevard, Parsons Boulevard, Guy R. Brewer Boulevard (formerly known as New York Boulevard but renamed for a local political leader in 1982), Sutphin Boulevard, and Union Turnpike, as well as the Van Wyck Expressway (I-678) and the Grand Central Parkway.

Jamaica Avenue is Jamaica's busiest thoroughfare. It begins at Broadway Junction in Brooklyn, near the boundary of the East New York neighborhood. The Avenue enters Jamaica east of the Van Wyck Expressway, and passes the Joseph Addabbo Social Security Administration Building, courthouses and the main building of the Queens Public Library, along with many discount stores. The 200-year-old King Manor Museum, once home to Rufus King, a founding father of the United States, is located at the corner of 153rd St. and Jamaica Ave. It includes a 2-story museum with over an acre of land and a public park. Directly across from the Museum is the former First Reformed Dutch Church of Jamaica, a National Register of Historic Places-listed landmark that has been adaptively reused into the Jamaica Performing arts center.

Hillside Avenue is one of the main thoroughfares of Jamaica. Hillside Avenue runs east from Myrtle Avenue in Richmond Hill, along the length of Jamaica, into Queens Village, and finally, Nassau County. It is a wide six-lane street with numerous commercial activities. Hillside Avenue separates Jamaica from Briarwood, Jamaica Hills and Jamaica Estates on the southern boundary.

Sutphin Boulevard is Jamaica's second busiest thoroughfare. It has two subway stations, as well as stations for the LIRR and the AirTrain JFK, and two Queens courthouses. It begins at Hillside Avenue and 147th Place in the north and works its way south and downhill connecting with Jamaica Avenue, Archer Avenue, Liberty Avenue, South Road, Linden Boulevard, and terminates at Rockaway Boulevard. At first it is a small four-lane street, but in the downtown area it provides six lanes. At 95th Avenue, it reemerges from the LIRR underpass and becomes a four-lane street to its southern endpoint.

Union Turnpike travels through, and serving as the northern border between the towns of Flushing and Jamaica. Though both towns were absorbed into New York City in 1898, the division is evident today in the addresses. Buildings on the north side generally begin with a 113- ZIP Code, indicating Flushing, and buildings to the south side begin with a 114- ZIP Code, indicating Jamaica. Union Turnpike separates the northern boundaries of Briarwood, Jamaica Hills and Jamaica Estates from the southern boundaries of Flushing and Fresh Meadows.

Rockaway Boulevard begins at 90th Avenue and Elderts Lane in Woodhaven, continuing southeast through Ozone Park, South Ozone Park, South Jamaica, Springfield Gardens, Brookville, and Meadowmere. The segment between Farmers Boulevard in Springfield Gardens and the New York City border in Meadowmere connects the two discontinuous sections of New York State Route 878, the Nassau Expressway. In addition, Rockaway Boulevard abuts the northern border of JFK Airport between Farmers and Brookville Boulevards.

Parks and recreation

Flushing Meadows–Corona Park abuts Jamaica on its far northwestern corner. At , it is the fourth-largest public park in New York City. The southernmost part of the park is adjacent to Willow Lake, which is named for the many species of Willow plants which inhabit the area. The Jamaica subway yard is located at the very south end of the park site, beyond Willow Lake.

Other major parks near downtown Jamaica include:
 Captain Tilly Park, located in Jamaica Hills
 Detective Keith L. Williams Park
 Roy Wilkins Park, in St. Albans
 St. Albans Park

Neighboring areas 

Neighboring areas are Jamaica Estates, Jamaica Hills, Holliswood, Bellerose, Briarwood, Cambria Heights, St. Albans, Hollis, Queens Village, South Ozone Park, Kew Gardens, Richmond Hill, Laurelton, Rosedale, Brookville, Rochdale, South Jamaica, Springfield Gardens, Hillcrest, Kew Gardens Hills, Fresh Meadows, Meadowmere, Meadowmere Park, and Woodhaven.

Notable residents 

Notable current and former residents of Jamaica include:

 50 Cent, rapper and entrepreneur
 Cecily Adams, actress
 Khandi Alexander, actress and dancer
 Marilyn Aschner (born 1948), professional tennis player
 Lloyd Banks, rapper and member of hip-hop group G-Unit
 Bob Beamon, Olympian and world record holder for long jump
 Fritz Billig, stamp dealer and author of Billig's Philatelic Handbooks
 Don Blackman, jazz-funk pianist, singer and songwriter
 Paul Bowles, writer and composer
 Jimmy Breslin, author and columnist
 Harvey Brooks, musician and composer
 Camille A. Brown, Tony nominated Choreographer
 Cal Bruton, basketball player
 Increase Carpenter Minuteman, Revolutionary war veteran
 Tina Charles, WNBA player current with the New York Liberty
 Mr. Cheeks, rapper and member of hip-hop group Lost Boyz
 Sri Chinmoy, philosopher and spiritual teacher
 Chinx, rapper
 Buck Clayton, jazz trumpeter
 Desiree Coleman, singer, actress
 Mario Cuomo, former governor of New York 1983–1995
 Nelson DeMille, author
 Rocco DiSpirito, chef
 Alan Dugan, poet
 Ann Flood, actress
 Ashrita Furman, holder of the most Guinness World Records, with 88 Guinness World Records
 Alonzo Holt, singer
 Scott Ian, rhythm guitarist for Anthrax 
 Marc Iavaroni, basketball player, former head coach of the Memphis Grizzlies
 K. Sparks, Christian hip hop musician
 Kamara James, Olympic fencer
 James P. Johnson, "stride" pianist and composer
 Crad Kilodney, writer
 Rufus King, signer of the United States Constitution
 Len Kunstadt, jazz/blues historian, record label owner
 Gerald S. Lesser psychologist, Sesame Street programming developer
 Jeffrey R. MacDonald, murderer
 Sally Marr, stand-up comic, dancer, actress and talent spotter, mother of comic Lenny Bruce, whose act she influenced
 Debi Mazar, actress
 Darryl McDaniels (DMC), rapper
 Metallica briefly lived here in April 1983 before recording their debut Kill 'Em All
 Marcus Miller, jazz composer, producer and multi-instrumentalist
 Nicki Minaj, rapper, born in Trinidad, brought to Queens at 5 years old 
 Charles Mingus, jazz bassist, composer and autobiographer
 Dalilah Muhammad, Olympic track and field athlete, gold-medalist in 400m hurdles
 Lamar Odom, NBA star, former reality TV star
 Walter O'Malley, former owner of the Brooklyn and L.A. Dodgers. Lived in Jamaica from 1917 to 1920.
 Richard Parsons, former chairman of Citigroup and former chairman and CEO of Time Warner
 Pepa (born 1964 or 1969 as Sandra Denton), actress, rapper, and member of hip-hop group Salt-N-Pepa
 Letty Cottin Pogrebin (born 1939), writer/journalist
 Khalid Reeves, former NBA Player
 Freddie Roman, comedian
 Al Sears, jazz saxophonist
 Assata Shakur, activist and convicted murderer
 Joseph Simmons (Run), rapper/pastor
 Russell Simmons, entrepreneur/producer
 Heathcliff Slocumb, former pitcher
 Fredro Starr, actor, rapper and member of hip-hop group Onyx
 William Grant Still, "dean of American black composers"
 Sticky Fingaz, actor, rapper and member of hip-hop group Onyx
 Eva Taylor, 1920s vocalist known as the "Dixie Nightingale"
 Lennie Tristano, jazz pianist and composer
 Fred Trump, real estate developer and father of Donald Trump
 Donald Trump, real estate tycoon, reality television star and 45th President of the United States
 Ben Webster, jazz tenor saxophonist
 Marinus Willett, member of the Sons of Liberty, officer in the Continental Army during the American Revolutionary War, mayor of New York (1807–08)
 Clarence Williams, jazz pianist and composer
 Fess Williams, jazz clarinetist
 Bernard Wright, pop/funk/jazz composer, keyboardist and singer
 Tony Yayo, rapper and member of hip-hop group G-Unit

See also 
 
 Masjid Al-Mamoor

References

External links 

 Greater Jamaica Development Corporation (the source of much of the historical information in this article)
 The Cultural Collaboration of Jamaica, JAMS (Jamaica Arts & Music Summer festival) sponsor
 "A Road Not Taken, Much" NY Times City Section, April 15, 2007
 Jamaica Center for Arts and Learning
 Map of Queens neighborhoods
 1873 map of Village of Jamaica
 1873 map of Town of Jamaica
 History of Queens County: Jamaica New York: W.W. Munsell & Co.; 1882. pp. 193–257.

 

 
1656 establishments in North America
1656 establishments in the Dutch Empire
Caribbean-American culture in New York City
County seats in New York (state)
Establishments in New Netherland
Former towns in New York City
Former villages in New York City
Neighborhoods in Queens, New York
New Netherland
Populated places established in 1656